The 2021 Sudirman Cup group stage was held at the Energia Areena in Vantaa, Finland, from 26 to 30 September 2021.

The group stage was the first stage of the 2021 Sudirman Cup. During the group stage, only the 2 highest-placing teams in all 4 groups advanced to the knockout stage.

Seeding
The seedings for the 16 teams were released by BWF around June 2021.  France and Australia originally were among the 16 teams but later on, withdrew from the competition. Thus, Finland was awarded a place as the host. New Zealand who originally have been given a place to replace Australia later on declined. In the end, French Polynesia was awarded the place for Oceania, replacing Australia, due to their performance at the 2019 Pacific Games.

Group composition

Group A

China vs Finland

Thailand vs India

China vs India

Thailand vs Finland

India vs Finland

China vs Thailand

Group B

Chinese Taipei vs Tahiti

South Korea vs Germany

Chinese Taipei vs Germany

South Korea vs Tahiti

Chinese Taipei vs South Korea

Germany vs Tahiti

Group C

Indonesia vs NBFR

Denmark vs Canada

Denmark vs NBFR

Indonesia vs Canada

Indonesia vs Denmark

Canada vs NBFR

Group D

Malaysia vs England

Japan vs Egypt

Japan vs England

Malaysia vs Egypt

Japan vs Malaysia

England vs Egypt

References

External links

2021 Sudirman Cup